The Sikule language (also called Sibigo, Sigulai, Ageumeui, or Wali Banuah) is an Austronesian language spoken on Simeulue island off the western coast of Sumatra in Indonesia. It belongs to the Malayo-Polynesian branch of the Austronesian languages. Sikule is one of Northwest Sumatra–Barrier Islands languages, which are a sub-group of Western Malayo-Polynesian.

Sikule is spoken in Salang, Alafan and Simeulue Barat district, on the northern of Simeulue island. It is apparently related to the Nias language. Ethnologue lists Lekon and Tapah as dialects.

Simeulue is spoken in the rest of Simeulue outside of Alafan, while Jamu (also called Kamano), related to Minangkabau, is spoken in the capital city of Sinabang.

Phonology

The vowel and consonant phonemes of Sikule are shown in the tables below.

See also
 Simeulue language

References

Sources
 Adelaar, Alexander, The Austronesian Languages of Asia and Madagascar: A Historical Perspective, The Austronesian Languages of Asia and Madagascar, pp. 1-42, Routledge Language Family Series, London, Routledge, 2005, 
 Nothofer, Bernd, The Barrier Island Languages in the Austronesian Language Family, Focal II: Papers From the Fourth International Conference on Austronesian Linguistics, pp. 87-109, Pacific Linguistics, Series C 94, Canberra, Research School of Pacific and Asian Studies, The Australian National University, 1986.
 
 

Northwest Sumatra–Barrier Islands languages
Languages of Indonesia
Languages of Aceh